Alan Reynolds (born 12 June 1974) is a former Irish footballer and coach. He is currently the assistant manager of both Derry City in the League of Ireland Premier Division & the Republic of Ireland U21. He is currently working as a Football In Community Development Officer for the Football Association of Ireland.

Playing career

Waterford United
He made his League of Ireland debut on 1 December 1991 for his hometown club Waterford United under the stewardship of Alfie Hale. His first goal for the Blues came on 21 November 1993.

Longford Town
After ten seasons he transferred to Longford Town for one season.

Cork City
He then signed for Cork City where he again spent only one season.

Shamrock Rovers
Reynolds then joined Shamrock Rovers. He made his debut on 11 April 2003 against Drogheda United
In his first season in the Hoops he played in four European games, including the famous UEFA Intertoto Cup win in Poland over Odra Wodzisław.

Player/Manager at Waterford
In March 2004 he was appointed player-manager at Waterford United with Paul McGrath as Director of Football. The Blues reached the FAI Cup Final in his first season before disastrously losing the game in the last five minutes.

Shelbourne
He resigned in March 2005 before joining Shelbourne making his debut in August and winning the League that season.

Rejoining Waterford
In July 2006 he rejoined Waterford United. He left the club exactly one year later in July 2007.

Rovers return
He made his second debut for Rovers on 6 July 2007 at Longford. In total he made a combined total of 40 appearances without scoring in his two spells at Rovers.

Management/Coaching Career

Derry City
On 10 January 2008, Reynolds was appointed Assistant Head Coach at Derry City.

St Patrick's Athletic
In 2014 Reynolds Joined Liam Buckley's coaching staff at St Patrick's Athletic. His spell with the club seen them win the FAI Cup in 2014 with a 2–0 win over Derry City and the EA Sports Cup in 2015 with a win over Galway United on penalties.

Cork City (Coach)
On 30 January 2016, Reynolds was appointed Assistant First Team Coach of Cork City. He spent one season at Turners Cross before leaving for his native Waterford. He helped the rebels in a win over Dundalk at the FAI Cup with a 1–0; he had just place after the same team in the Premier Division.

Return to Waterford
Again, Reynolds was  appointed as Waterford manager on 2 January 2017, working alongside Director of Football Pat Fenlon. He was given the allowance to sign some top League of Ireland players such as Kenny Browne, Paul Keegan and Mark O'Sullivan to name a few. The side achieved promotion at first opportunity, Waterfords 3–0 win over Wexford coupled with nearest challengers Cobh Ramblers 3–0 defeat to Cabinteely secured the First Division title with two games to spare and for the first time in ten years his hometown side were in the League of Ireland Premier Division due to his guidance.

In the 2018/2019 season, Reynolds guided Waterford to fourth position in the League of Ireland Premier Division.

Dundalk assistant
In late June 2020, Reynolds was named assistant manager at Dundalk after Waterford laid off their entire squad through E-Mail during the COVID-19 pandemic.

Republic of Ireland U21 assistant
In July 2021 Reynolds was named as assistant manager of the Reoublic of Ireland U21 team under manager Jim Crawford.

Shelbourne assistant
Reynolds was appointed assistant with Shelbourne ahead of the 2021 League of Ireland First Division season, while also remaining Republic of Ireland U21 assistant. After helping guide Shels to promotion by winning the 2021 League of Ireland First Division, Reynolds left the club when manager Ian Morris was sacked at the end of the season.

Derry City assistant
Reynolds was named as assistant manager of Derry City in December 2021, working under manager Ruaidhrí Higgins, combining the role with his Republic of Ireland U21 role. In October 2022, he turned down an offer to become manager of Bohemians.

Honours

Player
Waterford United
 League of Ireland First Division (2): 1989–90, 1997–98

Shelbourne
 League of Ireland Premier Division (1): 2006

Manager/Coach
St Patrick's Athletic
FAI Cup (1): 2014
League of Ireland Cup (1): 2015

Cork City
FAI Cup (1): 2016

Waterford
League of Ireland First Division (1): 2017

Shelbourne
League of Ireland First Division (1): 2021

Derry City
FAI Cup (1): 2022

Footnotes and references
Footnotes:

1974 births
Living people
Republic of Ireland association footballers
Association football midfielders
Association footballers from County Waterford
Waterford F.C. players
Longford Town F.C. players
Cork City F.C. players
Shamrock Rovers F.C. players
Shelbourne F.C. players
League of Ireland players
League of Ireland managers
Waterford F.C. managers
Republic of Ireland football managers